Akil is a town and the municipal seat of the Akil Municipality, Yucatán in Mexico. As of 2010, the town has a population of 10,176.

References

Populated places in Yucatán